Simon Yorke (27 July 1771 – 12 December 1834) was a Welsh politician who sat in the House of Commons from 1793 to 1802.
 
Yorke was the son of Philip Yorke of Erddig and his first wife Elizabeth Cust daughter of Sir John Cust, 3rd Baronet, and was born on 27 July 1771. He was educated at Eton College in 1784 and entered St John's College, Cambridge, on 29 November 1788. He married Margaret Holland, daughter of John Holland of Terydan on 11 March 1807.
     
Yorke was returned as Member of Parliament for Grantham on the united Brownlow and Rutland interest in a by election on 7 January 1793.  The vacancy had arisen six months earlier, but as he was then under age, his father filled the seat in the meantime. No speech or vote of his is known. He was a lieutenant in the Wrexham yeomanry from 1795 to 1797. In the 1796 general election, he headed the poll at Grantham, but he declined to stand in 1802. He was High Sheriff of Denbighshire in 1807–8.

Yorke died on 12 December 1834.

References

Sources

1771 births
1834 deaths
British MPs 1790–1796
British MPs 1796–1800
UK MPs 1801–1802
Members of the Parliament of Great Britain for English constituencies
High Sheriffs of Denbighshire
People educated at Eton College
Alumni of St John's College, Cambridge
Members of the Parliament of the United Kingdom for English constituencies